Vives is a surname of Catalan origin. It can refer to:

People 
Amadeo Vives, a Spanish musical composer
Carlos Vives (born 1961), Colombian singer, composer and actor
Fernando Vives (1871–1935), Chilean Jesuit
 Gérard Vivès (born 1962), French actor and TV presenter
Gilberto Calvillo Vives (born 1945), President of the National Institute of Statistics, Geography and Informatics (INEGI)
Giuseppe Vives (born 1980), Italian football midfielder
Juan Luis Vives (1493–1540), a famous Valencian scholar and humanist
Jaume Vicens i Vives (born 1910), Spanish historian
Josep Manyanet i Vives (1833–1901), Catalan priest who is venerated as a saint in the Roman Catholic Church
Nuria Llagostera Vives (born 1980), Spanish female tennis player
Peter Vives,  Spanish actor, singer and classical pianist
Salvador de Vives, mayor of Ponce, Puerto Rico 1840-42 and 1844-45
T. Edward Vives,  trombonist and composer
Xavier Vives, Catalan economist

Other uses
Vives (album), by Carlos Vives (2017)
Vivès, commune in the Pyrénées-Orientales department in southern France
11363 Vives, main belt asteroid

Catalan-language surnames